This is a list of Chiefs of Staff of the armed forces of the Democratic Republic of the Congo and Zaire.

The available information on the following officers is incomplete and sometimes contradictory. In addition to armed forces chiefs of staff, in 1966 Lieutenant Colonel Ferdinand Malila was listed as Army Chief of Staff.

Republic of the Congo (1960–71)

Republic of Zaire (1971–97)
Following Mobutu Sese Seko's take over of Republic of the Congo, the country was renamed the Republic of Zaire.

Democratic Republic of the Congo (1997–present)

Notes

References

Democratic Republic of the Congo military personnel
Congo Democratic